Catathelasma imperiale is a species of agaric (gilled mushroom) in the family Biannulariaceae. Basidiocarps (fruit bodies) are stocky, with a double annulus (ring), and a tapering to rooting stipe (stem). The species is ectomycorrhizal with conifers and is found in continental Europe and Asia. Reports from North America are unconfirmed and may refer to Catathelasma evanescens or similar species. Fruit bodies are edible and collected for food in China and elsewhere. The species is widespread but uncommon and is assessed as globally "near threatened" on the IUCN Red List of Threatened Species.

Taxonomy
Catathelasma imperiale was first described from Sweden in 1845 by Norwegian botanist Nicolai Lund as Agaricus imperialis, but this name is illegitimate since two earlier (and different) fungi had already been described under the same name. The species was first legitimately described, as Armillaria imperialis, by Finnish mycologist Petter Adolf Karsten in 1879. In 1922 the Austrian botanist Günther Beck von Mannagetta und Lerchenau created the new genus Biannularia for this species, making it Biannularia imperialis. In 1940, Singer transferred it to the existing genus Catathelasma, considering the two genera to be synonymous. Recent DNA research confirms this synonymy.

The epithet "imperiale", meaning "imperial" refers to the (at times) imposing size of the fruit bodies.

Description

Fruit bodies are agaricoid with a pileus (cap) that is convex and sticky at first becoming flat or slightly depressed and dry, 80–400 mm in diameter, orange brown to hazel brown, with darker patches. The lamellae (gills) are whitish to cream, decurrent, crowded, and sometimes forked. The stipe (stem) is compact, 50–180 mm long, tapering to the base, often rooting and partly buried, pale brown with a double ring. The fruit body has a mealy or cucumber-like smell. The spore print is white. Microscopically, the spores are subcylindrical, often fusoid, 12.5–16.0 × 5.0–6.5 μm, smooth, and amyloid. The hyphae have clamp connections.

Habitat and distribution

Catathelasma imperiale is an ectomycorrhizal species, forming an association with conifers, particularly spruce.
Originally described from Scandinavia, it has been recorded from most northern countries in continental Europe as far south as Italy. It has also been recorded in Asia from China, Korea, and Japan. Records from North America are uncertain, since DNA sequencing of specimens determined as "C. imperiale" have (to date) proven to belong to C. evanescens or C. ventricosum.

Conservation

The species is legally protected in Poland and is included in the Red Lists of 15 European countries. It is considered declining everywhere due to forest eutrophication, habitat destruction, and habitat change. Catathelasma imperiale has consequently been assessed as "near threatened" on the IUCN Red List of Threatened Species.

Edibility

Catathelasma imperiale is edible and collected for food in China, Bhutan, Ukraine, and Russia. In Ukraine, it is known as korban, or the Hutsul mushroom, because it is common among the Hutsuls who are said to be experts at finding it. In the Carpathian mountains, it grows in coniferous and spruce forests at an altitude of 400 – 1000 m. In the Hutsul culinary tradition, it is often dried, powdered, and used as a spice in gravies, kulish, stews, and bakes. It is also used as a meat substitute in patties during Lent.

References

Fungi of Europe
Fungi of Asia
Fungi described in 1879
Taxa named by Petter Adolf Karsten